Johan Adolfsson (born September 26, 1986) is a Swedish  professional ice hockey player. He is currently an unrestricted free agent who most recently was a member of Färjestad BK of the Swedish Hockey League (SHL).

Adolfsson has played the majority of his professional career in the Swedish second tier, Allsvenskan. While under contract with Örebro HK, Adolfsson began the 2016–17 season with HC Vita Hästen before he was recalled to the SHL with Örebro HK on his 30th birthday.

References

External links

1986 births
Living people
AIK IF players
Färjestad BK players
Örebro HK players
Swedish ice hockey right wingers
HC Vita Hästen players
Sportspeople from Örebro